Capriva del Friuli () is a comune (municipality)   in the Italian region Friuli-Venezia Giulia, located about  northwest of Trieste and about  west of Gorizia.

Capriva del Friuli borders the following municipalities: Cormons, Moraro, Mossa, San Floriano del Collio, San Lorenzo Isontino.
 
The municipality is located in the hilly Collio region, noted for viticulture.

History 
The area was occupied in Roman times, after which it was subsumed into Lombardy.   Around the year 1000, it came under the control of the Patriarchate of Aquileia, passing to the Venetians in 1428.

In the 16th century Capriva became part of the Habsburg territories, and continued to be ruled from Vienna until after the First World War, when it was transferred to Italy.

References

Cities and towns in Friuli-Venezia Giulia